Webb City is an unincorporated community in Franklin County, in the U.S. state of Arkansas.

History
The first permanent settlement at Webb City was made ca. 1840. A post office called Webb City was established in 1875, and remained in operation until 1955.

References

Unincorporated communities in Franklin County, Arkansas